"I Wanna Live" is a song written by John D. Loudermilk and recorded by American country music singer Glen Campbell. It was released in March 1968 as the lead single from the album, Hey Little One. The song was Campbell's sixth release on the country charts and his first of five number ones on the country chart. The song spent three non-consecutive weeks at number one and a total of fifteen weeks on the country charts.  The song was also Glen Campbell's third Top 40 release peaking at number thirty-six.

Chart performance

Cover versions
"I Wanna Live" was covered by Eddy Raven in 1976 and reached number 87 on the US country chart.

References

1968 singles
Glen Campbell songs
Songs written by John D. Loudermilk
Eddy Raven songs
Capitol Records singles
1968 songs
Song recordings produced by Al De Lory
Albums recorded at Capitol Studios